George Darwin Lamont (January 24, 1819 – January 15, 1876) was an American lawyer and politician from New York.

Early life
He attended Yale College for a year and a half, then studied law in Lockport, received a degree from Yale in 1841, was admitted to the bar the same year, and commenced practice in Lockport.

Career
He was District Attorney of Niagara County from 1851 to 1853.

He was a member of the New York State Senate (29th D.) in 1859, elected to fill the vacancy caused by the death of Horatio J. Stow. He was seated on March 21, and attended the remainder of the session until April 19.

In December 1862, he was appointed by Judge Charles A. Peabody as Prosecuting Attorney at the U.S. Provisional Court for the State of Louisiana, and remained in office until the court was discontinued in April 1865. Afterwards he resumed the practice of law in Lockport. He was Judge of the Niagara County Court from 1866 to November 1868 when he was appointed to the New York Supreme Court to fill a vacancy. In November 1871, he was elected to a full term on the Supreme Court (8th D.), and died in office.

Personal life
In 1841, he married Mary Cole, and they had three children.

Lamont died on January 15, 1876, in Lockport.

Sources

1819 births
1876 deaths
Republican Party New York (state) state senators
New York Supreme Court Justices
Politicians from Lockport, New York
People from Yates, New York
County district attorneys in New York (state)
Yale College alumni
19th-century American politicians
19th-century American judges